Ravenna Creek is a stream in the Ravenna and Roosevelt neighborhoods of Seattle, Washington, whose present daylighted length of nearly  is entirely within the Ravenna & Cowen Parks.

Ravenna Creek used to drain Green Lake into Lake Washington's Union Bay, but urban development and the lowering of the two lakes in 1911 and 1916 resulted in the disappearance of the creekbed between Green Lake and Cowen Park and between Ravenna Park and Union Bay. Ravenna Creek's current source is a wetland in the northwest corner of Cowen Park, at NE 62nd Street and Brooklyn Avenue NE. It is also fed by springs throughout Ravenna Park, and is joined there by a second branch which begins near the intersection of NE 65th Street and 23rd Avenue NE. Until 2006, the creek ended at a sewer grate where the park's trail system opened into a soccer field.

A daylighting project completed in May 2006 disconnected the creek from the sewer system and extended its bed  towards the southeast corner of Ravenna Park, at which point it enters a pipeline. This pipeline, which runs southward along 25th Avenue NE to the NE 45th Street viaduct, empties into University Slough, thereby reconnecting Ravenna Creek to Lake Washington.

Gallery

See also 
 Daylighting (streams)
 Stream
 Water resources
 List of rivers of Washington
 Thornton Creek
 Yesler Creek

References 

Landforms of Seattle
Rivers of Washington (state)
Rivers of King County, Washington